Daveigh Elizabeth Chase (née Chase-Schwallier; born July 24, 1990) is an American actress, singer, and model. She began her career appearing in minor television roles before being cast as Samantha Darko in Richard Kelly's cult film Donnie Darko. She would subsequently provide the voices of Chihiro Ogino in the English dub of the Studio Ghibli film Spirited Away, and Lilo Pelekai in the Disney animated feature film Lilo & Stitch and its subsequent franchise, before appearing as Samara Morgan, the child antagonist in the 2002 horror film The Ring.

Between 2006 and 2011, she played a supporting part in the HBO series Big Love, portraying Rhonda Volmer, a sociopathic teenager raised in a polygamist family. In 2009, she reprised her role as Samantha Darko in S. Darko, a sequel to Donnie Darko. She appeared in the 2016 horror film Jack Goes Home.

Early life
Chase was born on July 24, 1990, in Las Vegas, Nevada. Her name was changed to Daveigh Elizabeth Chase after her parents, Cathy Chase and John Schwallier, divorced. Chase was raised in Albany, Oregon.

Career
Chase's big break came in 2002 when she won the lead role as the voice of a Hawaiian girl, Lilo Pelekai, in the Disney animated feature, Lilo & Stitch. The film relates how Lilo befriends a strange and destructive blue alien thinly disguised as a dog, whom she calls "Stitch", and how she tries to teach him how to behave using Elvis Presley music as exemplars. For her performance, Chase would go on to win an Annie Award in 2003 and star in the follow-up TV series, Lilo & Stitch: The Series. Chase also voiced the role of the lead character, Chihiro Ogino, a 10 year-old Japanese girl, in the American dub of the anime Japanese feature, Spirited Away.

In 2002, Chase starred in the role of Samara Morgan in the feature film, The Ring. Chase was awarded the 2003 Best Villain award at the MTV Movie Awards for her performance, beating out Mike Myers, Colin Farrell, Willem Dafoe and Daniel Day-Lewis. In the sequel to The Ring, The Ring Two (2005), Chase was credited for her role as Samara Morgan because of the use of archive footage from the first Ring, but Kelly Stables performed all of the new archive footage.

Chase's main other major film and TV credits between 2000 and 2005 were the film Donnie Darko (2001), as Donnie's younger sister, Samantha, and Oliver Beene (2003–2004), as Oliver's quirky girlfriend Joyce. Other credits include The Rats (2002), Carolina (2003), R.L. Stine's Haunted Lighthouse (2003) in which she played a flying ghost called Annabel, and Beethoven's 5th (2003). She also made guest appearances in Touched by an Angel, Charmed, ER, Family Law, and The Practice.

In 2006, Chase was given the role of Rhonda Volmer in the HBO drama series Big Love which centers on a polygamist family and its patriarch, Bill Henrickson, played by Bill Paxton. The show focuses upon Henrickson's relationship with his three wives. Chase's character is the child bride of a prophet, Roman Grant, played by Harry Dean Stanton.

Leroy & Stitch, the finale to Lilo & Stitch: The Series, was released in 2006. Chase then appeared in the second season of Big Love, which aired in 2007. She also voiced Betsy in the PBS show Betsy's Kindergarten Adventures the same year. She reprised her role as Donnie Darko's younger sister, Samantha, in the film S. Darko. The story picks up seven years after the first film when Samantha Darko and her best friend Corey are now 18 years old and on a road trip to Los Angeles when they are afflicted by bizarre visions.

In 2015, she starred in the thriller film Killer Crush and in the independent horror film Wild in Blue with Karen Black. In 2016, she starred in the thriller film American Romance with Nolan Gerard Funk, and appeared in the thriller film Jack Goes Home with Rory Culkin, Britt Robertson, Lin Shaye and Nikki Reed.

Personal life
Chase was arrested in November 2017 for riding in a stolen car. She was arrested again in 2018 for drug possession charges 18 months after allegedly leaving a dying man outside an emergency room.

Filmography

Film

Television

Video games

Awards and nominations

References

External links

1990 births
Living people
Actresses from Las Vegas
Actresses from Oregon
American child actresses
American child singers
American film actresses
American people convicted of theft
American prisoners and detainees
American television actresses
American video game actresses
American voice actresses
Annie Award winners
People from Albany, Oregon
20th-century American actresses
21st-century American actresses
21st-century American singers
21st-century American women singers